Tom Savage (born 1948 in New York City) is an American poet most closely associated with the New York School.  He attended the Naropa Institute in 1976 and with James Sherry co-edited the inaugural issue of Roof Magazine.  He is the author of upwards of seven volumes of poetry, including; "Housing, Preservation & Development" (Cheap Review Press 1988),  "Processed Words" (Coffeehouse Press, 1990), "Political Conditions Physical States" (United Artists Books 1993) and "From Herat to Baikh and Back Again" (Fly by Night Press 2014).  He has taught workshops at among other places; the Poetry Project, the Juilliard School and Saint Malachy's Roman Catholic Church (The Actor's Chapel). He has edited Tamarind magazine which has been published on and off for many years.

References

External links
At the St.Mark's Poetry Project - 
On Poetry Thin Air TV - 

American male poets
American editors
Writers from Manhattan
Living people
1948 births
People from Greenwich Village